The Soulful Rebel is an album by vibraphonist Johnny Lytle recorded in 1971 and originally issued on the Milestone label.

Reception
Allmusic gave the album 3 stars.

Track listing
All compositions by Johnny Lytle except as indicated
 "Gunky" - 4:31
 "The New Village Caller" - 4:48
 "Didn't We?" (Jimmy Webb) - 3:51
 "Lela" - 3:43
 "The Soulful Rebel Suite:"  	
 "The Soulful Rebel" - 4:26
 "High Treason" - 3:34
 "The Struggle" - 3:35
 "Inner Peace" - 4:24
 "Does Anybody Really Know What Time It Is?" (Robert Lamm) - 4:19

Personnel
Johnny Lytle - vibraphone
Billy Nunn - organ, electric piano
David Spinozza - guitar
Ron Carter - electric bass 
Josell Carter - drums
Ray Barretto - congas

References

Milestone Records albums
Johnny Lytle albums
1971 albums
Albums produced by Orrin Keepnews